Dirty Hit is a British independent record label founded in December 2009 by Jamie Oborne, Brian Smith, and former England footballer, Ugo Ehiogu. It is currently based in West London, England. Their releases are distributed to digital platforms by Ingrooves Music Group.

Since Dirty Hit's inception, Oborne has been the main driving force behind the label. Previously part of a signed band, he moved into artist management aiming to provide artist support. Providing a platform for two acts that Oborne managed, was the main motivation behind starting the label. Both The 1975 and Benjamin Francis Leftwich thus became the first signings. The 1975 were the first act on the label to achieve mainstream success, having achieved a number 1 on the UK Albums Chart in September 2013 with their eponymous debut album. Oborne also manages some of the groups on the label through his All On Red management company. In February 2019 it was announced that The 1975 had signed a new three-album deal with the record company.

In May 2017, the label organised the Dirty Hit Tour featuring Superfood, King Nun and Pale Waves.

Artists

Former artists

References

External links
 

 
2009 establishments in England
British companies established in 2009
British independent record labels
Record labels established in 2009